Beaver was a steamship originally owned and operated by the Hudson’s Bay Company.  She was the first steamship to operate in the Pacific Northwest of North America, and made remote parts of the west coast of Canada accessible for maritime fur trading.  At one point she was chartered by the Royal Navy for surveying the coastline of British Columbia. She served off the coast from 1836 until 1888, when she was wrecked.

Service
Beaver served trading posts maintained by the Hudson's Bay Company between the Columbia River and Russian America (Alaska) and played an important role in helping maintain British control in British Columbia during the Fraser Canyon Gold Rush of 1858–59. In 1862 the Royal Navy chartered her to survey and chart the coast of the Colony of British Columbia. She also provided assistance to the Royal Navy at Bute Inlet during the Chilcotin War.

Loss

A consortium that became the British Columbia Towing and Transportation Company in 1874 purchased her, and used her as a towboat until 25 July 1888. On that day an inebriated crew ran her aground on rocks in Burrard Inlet at Prospect Point in Vancouver's Stanley Park. The wreck finally sank in July 1892 when the wake of the passing steamer Yosemite struck it, but only after enterprising locals had stripped much of the wreck for souvenirs. The Vancouver Maritime Museum houses a collection of Beaver remnants including the boiler and two drive shafts for the paddle wheels, one raised in the 1960s and the other returned from a collection in Tacoma, along with the boiler. A plaque commemorates the site of the sinking. Divers surveyed the wreck in the 1960s. However, when the Underwater Archaeological Society of BC did so in the 1990s, they found she had mostly disintegrated due to rot and currents.

See also
 List of ships in British Columbia
 List of steamboats on the Columbia River
 Steamboats of the Columbia River
 William Henry McNeill

Image gallery

References

 Horner, John B. (1921). Oregon: Her History, Her Great Men, Her Literature. The J.K. Gill Co.: Portland
 Pethick, Derek, The SS Beaver, 1974

Victorian-era merchant ships of Canada
Merchant ships of the United States
Shipwrecks of the British Columbia coast
Stanley Park
Paddle steamers of British Columbia
Steamboats of Washington (state)
Sidewheel steamboats of Washington (state)
Maritime incidents in July 1888
Maritime incidents in 1892
Steamboats of the Columbia River
Ships built by the Blackwall Yard
1835 ships
Fur trade
Hudson's Bay Company ships